Milomir Stakić (born 19 January 1962 in Marićka, Prijedor, Bosnia and Herzegovina) is a Bosnian Serb who was charged with genocide, complicity in genocide, violations of the customs of war and crimes against humanity by the International Criminal Tribunal for the Former Yugoslavia (ICTY) for his actions in the Prijedor region during the Bosnian War. 

In the 1991 elections he became Vice-President of the Prijedor Municipal Assembly as a member of the Serbian Democratic Party. He soon established a parallel Serb shadow government in the region. He faced eight charges in all, ranging from genocide and extermination, to deportation and persecution in the form of destroying local villages as well as mosques and Catholic churches. He was eventually found guilty of five charges, and acquitted of three counts of genocide. The court ruled: "Despite the comprehensive pattern of atrocities against non-Serbs in Prijedor, the trial chamber has not found this to be a case of genocide, rather it is a case of persecution, deportation and extermination." He was sentenced to life imprisonment, which was later reduced to forty years through the appeals process. 

In January 2007 he was transferred to France to serve his sentence of 40 years' imprisonment. At least until April 2011 "Mr Stakić did not co-operate with
the Prosecution in the course of his trial, appeal, or enforcement of his sentence." In July 2011 the court "declines to grant Mr. Milomir Stakić sentence remission."

See also
Bosnian War
International Criminal Tribunal for the Former Yugoslavia
Omarska camp
Prijedor ethnic cleansing

Notes

Politicians of Republika Srpska
1962 births
Living people
People from Prijedor
People convicted by the International Criminal Tribunal for the former Yugoslavia
Serbs of Bosnia and Herzegovina convicted of war crimes
Bosnia and Herzegovina people imprisoned abroad
Serbs of Bosnia and Herzegovina convicted of crimes against humanity
Serb Democratic Party (Bosnia and Herzegovina) politicians